"Or Nah" is a song by American rapper The Game, released as the second single from his 2014 compilation Blood Moon: Year of the Wolf. The song features additional vocals from fellow rappers Too Short, Problem, AV, King Marie and American singer Eric Bellinger. The track samples Too Short's 1989 song "Don't Fight the Feelin'"

Music video
The video of Or Nah was released on September 8, 2014, on YouTube.

Chart performance

References

2014 singles
2014 songs
The Game (rapper) songs
Too Short songs
Songs written by The Game (rapper)
Songs written by Problem (rapper)
MNRK Music Group singles